"Wango Tango" is a song written and recorded by American hard rock musician Ted Nugent. The song peaked on the Billboard Hot 100 at #86.  One of Nugent's best known songs, it has been a staple of his live performances for many years.

Allmusic reviewer Bret Adams has praised the song as "addictive" and "wickedly catchy", also marking it as an 'album pick' for being one of the best tracks of parent album Scream Dream. However, it was ranked seventh on Guitar World's list of the "100 Worst Guitar Solos".

Chart positions

See also

1980 in music
Ted Nugent discography
"Wang Dang Sweet Poontang"

References

1980 singles
1980 songs
American hard rock songs
American heavy metal songs
Epic Records singles
Songs written by Ted Nugent
Ted Nugent songs